Eduardo Assunção Varela (born 16 July 2000), commonly known as Dinho or Pogba, is a São Toméan footballer who plays as a midfielder for FC Porto Real and the São Tomé and Príncipe national team.

Club career
On 13 January 2019, Dinho joined Equatorial Guinean Liga Nacional de Fútbol club Cano Sport Academy.

International career
Dinho made his international debut for São Tomé and Príncipe in 2017.

References

2000 births
Living people
Association football midfielders
Association football defenders
São Tomé and Príncipe footballers
São Tomé and Príncipe international footballers
UDRA players
Cano Sport Academy players
São Tomé and Príncipe expatriate footballers
São Tomé and Príncipe expatriate sportspeople in Equatorial Guinea
Expatriate footballers in Equatorial Guinea